Nicolas Baullery, Bolleri or Bollery (c. 1560 - 1630) was a French painter and illustrator.

Life
He was from a Parisian family and his father Jérôme and nephew Jacques Blanchard were also painters - Blanchard served as an apprentice under Nicolas.

He worked on several churches in Paris (the Benedictine Blancs-Manteaux, the Third Order one of Picpus, the Chartreux) and produced 'petits Mays' for Notre-Dame de Paris.  He also produced engravings on the theme of Henry IV of France's entry into Paris in 1594.

Works
 Nativité, church at Chassey
 Christ before Pilate, formerly in the church at Charly-sur-Marne, location now unknown (the church was destroyed in World War I and its contents were housed in civic buildings; the painting was sold by the town in 1981; on 15 October 2008, number 13 in the list of works dispersed from Guy and Christiane Aldecoa's collection was misidentified as the work)
 Adoration of the Shepherds, église Saint Martin, Fontenay-Trésigny
 Adoration of the Shepherds, cathédrale Saint-Étienne de Toulouse
 Peasant dance ou Country Dance at Celleneuve, Montpellier, musée Fabre

Previously attributed to him
 Henry IV Renouncing Protestantism in the basilique Saint-Denis, undated, musée d'art et d'histoire de Meudon, inv. A. 1974-1-6. (formerly in the l'église Saint-Martin de Meudon).

Bibliography 

  Pierre Marcel, Jean Guiffrey, « Une illustration du "Pas des armes de Sandricourt" par Jérôme ou Nicolas Bollery », dans Gazette des Beaux-Arts, 1907, t.37, p. 277-288.

References 

1630 deaths
16th-century French painters
17th-century French painters
Year of birth uncertain